Gbagada General Hospital is a general hospital in Lagos, Nigeria.

History
Gbagada General hospital was founded in 1972 by the then Governor of Lagos state, Lateef Jakande. It also serve as the annex for Lagos State University Teaching Hospital.
The chief medical director reports that it receives around 800 patients every day.

The multi-specialty hospital which is situated inside a large expanse of land has a host of highly experienced doctors and has over ten major clinical departments. 

In 2020, a wing for COVID-19 patients was opened within the hospital with 118 beds.

References

Hospitals in Lagos
Hospitals established in 1972
1972 establishments in Nigeria